Robbie Newton (born 30 May 1952) is a New Zealand former cricketer. He played in eleven first-class and five List A matches for Canterbury and Wellington from 1973 to 1975.

References

External links
 

1952 births
Living people
New Zealand cricketers
Canterbury cricketers
Wellington cricketers
People from Lincoln, New Zealand
Cricketers from Canterbury, New Zealand